Broadband over power lines (BPL) is a method of power-line communication (PLC) that allows relatively high-speed digital data transmission over the public electric power distribution wiring. BPL uses higher frequencies, a wider frequency range and different technologies compared to other forms of power-line communications to provide high-rate communication over longer distances. BPL uses frequencies that are part of the radio spectrum allocated to over-the-air communication services; therefore, the prevention of interference to, and from, these services is a very important factor in designing BPL systems.

History
BPL is based on PLC technology developed as far back as 1914 by US telecommunications company AT&T. Electricity companies have been bundling radio frequency on the same line as electrical current to monitor the performance of their own power grids for years. More recently there have been attempts to implement access BPL, or the provision of internet services to customers via the grid. The prospect of BPL was predicted in 2004 to possibly motivate DSL and cable operators to more quickly serve rural communities.

The high level of attenuation (or data signal loss) from access BPL power cables had two critical effects: 
First, a request to increase signal levels was opposed by groups within the radio community (DOD, FAA, FEMA, amateur radio) that had already documented significant interference. Second, the data rate was greatly reduced when a robust error correction code was added.

Implementation
Generally BPL is described as either In-House BPL to network machines within a building (including power line-based WiFi extenders), or Access BPL which will carry broadband Internet using power lines and allow power companies to monitor power systems.

Because electric current and radio (data) signals oscillate at different frequencies they do not interfere with each other enough to significantly disrupt data transmission.  

Medium voltage (MV) lines carry generally up to a few tens of kilovolts, over a few kilometres between the electricity distribution stations and pole-mounted transformers. Low voltage lines transmit a few hundred volts over a few hundreds of metres, usually from pole-mounted transformers into a home or business.

Typically modem couplers embed data signals on to MV lines at the substation, with extractors at the LV distribution transformer feeding power into a group of buildings.

BPL modems transmit in medium and high frequency (1.6 to 80 MHz electric carrier). The asymmetric speed in the modem is generally from 256 kbit/s to 2.7 Mbit/s. In the repeater situated in the meter room, the speed is up to 45 Mbit/s and can be connected to 256 PLC modems. In the medium voltage stations, the speed from the head ends to the Internet is up to 135 Mbit/s. To connect to the Internet, utilities can use optical fiber backbone or fixed wireless.

Utility companies use frequencies below 490 kHz for their own data applications. Most BPL equipment was built to operate between 1.7 MHz and 30 MHz and occasionally up to 80 MHz.

Technical challenges
Deployment of BPL has illustrated a number of fundamental challenges, the primary one being that power lines are inherently a very noisy environment. Every time a device turns on or off, it introduces a pop or click into the line. Switching power supplies often introduce noisy harmonics into the line. And unlike coaxial cable or twisted-pair, the wiring has no inherent noise rejection.

The second major issue is electromagnetic compatibility (EMC). The system was expected to use frequencies of 10 to 30 MHz in the high frequency (HF) range, used for decades by military, aeronautical, amateur radio, and by shortwave broadcasters. Power lines are unshielded and will act as antennas for the signals they carry, and they will cause interference to high frequency radio communications and broadcasting. In 2007, NATO Research and Technology Organisation released a report which concluded that widespread deployment of BPL may have a "possible detrimental effect upon military HF radio communications."

Deployments
There have been many attempts worldwide to implement access BPL, all which have indicated that BPL is not viable as a means of delivering broadband Internet access. This is because of two problems: limited reach, and low bandwidth which do not come close to matching ADSL, Wi-Fi, and even 3G mobile. World major providers have either limited their BPL deployments to low-bandwidth connected equipment via smart grids, or ceased BPL operations altogether.

Australia saw trials of access BPL between 2004 and 2007; but no active access BPL deployments appear to remain there.

In the UK, the BBC published the results of tests to detect interference from BPL installations.

In the US, in October 2004, the US Federal Communications Commission adopted rules to facilitate the deployment of "Access BPL", the marketing term for Internet access service over power lines.

The technical rules are more liberal than those advanced by the US national amateur radio organization, the American Radio Relay League (ARRL), and other spectrum users, but include provisions that require BPL providers to investigate and correct any interference they cause.

One service was announced in 2004 for Ohio, Kentucky, and Indiana by Current Communications but they left the BPL business in 2008.

On August 3, 2006, FCC adopted a memorandum opinion and an order on broadband over power lines, giving the go-ahead to promote broadband service to all Americans.  The order rejected calls from aviation, business, commercial, amateur radio and other sectors of spectrum users to limit or prohibit deployment until further study was completed. FCC chief Kevin Martin said that BPL "holds great promise as a ubiquitous broadband solution that would offer a viable alternative to cable, digital subscriber line, fiber, and wireless broadband solutions".

In the US, International Broadband Electric Communications (IBEC), which had an ambitious plan to provide access BPL in the US, ceased BPL operations in January 2012.

Standards
IEEE 1901 is a standard for high speed (up to 500 Mbit/s at the physical layer) BPL. It uses transmission frequencies below 100 MHz. It is usable by all classes of BPL devices, including BPL devices used for the last mile connection (less than 1500m to the premises) to internet access services as well as BPL devices used within buildings for local area networks, smart grid, PLC applications.

Failure scenarios
There are many ways in which the communication signal may have error introduced into it. Interference, cross chatter, some active devices, and some passive devices all introduce noise or attenuation into the signal. When error becomes significant the devices controlled by the unreliable signal may fail, become inoperative, or operate in an undesirable fashion.

 Interference: Interference from nearby systems can cause signal degradation as the modem may not be able to determine a specific frequency among many signals in the same bandwidth.
 Signal degradation by active devices: Devices such as relays, transistors, and rectifiers create noise in their respective systems, increasing the likelihood of signal degradation. Arc-fault circuit interrupter (AFCI) devices, required by some recent electrical codes for living spaces, may also attenuate the signals.
 Signal attenuation by passive devices: Transformers and DC–DC converters attenuate the input frequency signal almost completely. "Bypass" devices become necessary for the signal to be passed on to the receiving node. A bypass device may consist of three stages, a filter in series with a protection stage and coupler, placed in parallel with the passive device.

See also
 Power-over-fiber
 IEEE 1901
 HD-PLC
 Broadband
 List of broadband over power line deployments
 National broadband plans from around the world

References

Broadband